The Two Lives of Mattia Pascal is a 1985 Italian drama film directed by Mario Monicelli. It was adapted from the novel Il fu Mattia Pascal by Luigi Pirandello. It was entered into the 1985 Cannes Film Festival.

Plot
 Mattia Pascal, an unsuccessful small farmer in northern Italy, decides to try his luck at a French casino and wins. When he sees in a newspaper story that a man with the same name has died mysteriously, he decides that this is a perfect opportunity to begin a new life. He takes the name Arturo Meis and moves to Rome. But he finds that a new life is not necessarily a more satisfying one.

Cast
 Marcello Mastroianni - Mattia Pascal
 Senta Berger - Clara
 Flavio Bucci - Terenzio Papiano
 Laura Morante - Adriana Paleari
 Laura del Sol - Romilda Pescatore
 Caroline Berg - Véronique
 Andréa Ferréol - Silvia Caporale
 Bernard Blier - Anselmo Paleari
 Alessandro Haber - Mino Pomino
 Néstor Garay - Giambattista Malagna
 Rosalia Maggio - Vedova Pescatore
 Clelia Rondinella - Oliva Salvoni
 Carlo Bagno - Pellegrinotto, dattilografo
 Flora Cantone - Madre di Mattia
 Helen Stirling - Zia Scolastica
 François Marinovich - Padre di Pomino 
 Elettra Mancini Ferrua - Domestica casa Pascal 
 Paul Muller - Ladro di fiches a Montecarlo 
 Victor Cavallo - Avv. Cirino Settebellezze 
 Tonino Proietti - Amante di Clara 
 Giuseppe Cederna - Biscazziere elegante a Venezia 
 Peter Berling - Aristide Melainassis 
 Roberto Accornero - Suicida a Montecarlo

References

External links

1985 films
1980s Italian-language films
1985 drama films
Italian drama films
Films about identity theft
Films based on works by Luigi Pirandello
Films based on Italian novels
Films directed by Mario Monicelli
Films with screenplays by Suso Cecchi d'Amico
Films scored by Nicola Piovani
1980s Italian films